Joseph Arthur Walters (12 February 1940 – 16 May 2021) was an English first-class cricketer who played five matches for Nottinghamshire in 1958 and 1959.

Walters was signed by Nottinghamshire in 1954 at the age of 14. A leg-spinner, he took 6 for 139 off 36.3 overs against Oxford University in May 1959. It was the only match in which he was dismissed: in his nine innings he was not out eight times, and by a statistical quirk his final batting average of 64 was more than three times his highest score.

Walters' professional cricket career was ended by an injury he suffered in a fall at work. He played his last match at 19 years of age. He died in May 2021, two months after he and his wife Marian had celebrated their diamond wedding anniversary.

References

1940 births
2021 deaths
English cricketers
Nottinghamshire cricketers
People from Bolsover
Cricketers from Derbyshire